Cotopaxi is one of the provinces of Ecuador. The capital is Latacunga.

Cantons 
The province is divided into 7 cantons. The following table lists each canton with its population (per the 2001 census), its area in square kilometres (km2), and the name of the canton seat (capital).

Demographics 
Ethnic groups as of the Ecuadorian census of 2010:
Mestizo  72.1%
Indigenous  22.1%
White  2.3%
Montubio  1.8%
Afro-Ecuadorian  1.7%
Other  0.1%

See also 

 Cotopaxi National Park
 Llanganates National Park
 Panzaleo (ethnic group)
 Provinces of Ecuador
 Cantons of Ecuador
 Centro de Levantamientos Integrados de Recursos Naturales por Sensores Remotos

References

External links 
  Gobierno Provincia de Cotopaxi, official website
 Cotopaxi Tours

 
Provinces of Ecuador